The Valley City Public School District is a system of public schools serving Valley City, North Dakota and the surrounding rural area.

Elementary schools
Washington Elementary School
Jefferson Elementary School

Junior/Senior High School
Valley City High School

School districts in North Dakota
Education in Barnes County, North Dakota